Nephotettix virescens is a species of true bug in the family Cicadellidae. It is a pest of millets. It is found in eastern India as well as Southeast Asia, including China. It is found in Guam as well.

References

Chiasmini
Insect pests of millets